Performance engineering encompasses the techniques applied during a systems development life cycle to ensure the non-functional requirements for performance (such as throughput, latency, or memory usage) will be met. It may be alternatively referred to as systems performance engineering within systems engineering, and software performance engineering or application performance engineering within software engineering.

As the connection between application success and business success continues to gain recognition, particularly in the mobile space, application performance engineering has taken on a preventive and perfective role within the software development life cycle. As such, the term is typically used to describe the processes, people and technologies required to effectively test non-functional requirements, ensure adherence to service levels and optimize application performance prior to deployment.

The term performance engineering encompasses more than just the software and supporting infrastructure, and as such the term performance engineering is preferable from a macro view. Adherence to the non-functional requirements is also validated post-deployment by monitoring the production systems.  This is part of IT service management (see also ITIL).

Performance engineering has become a separate discipline at a number of large corporations, with tasking separate but parallel to systems engineering.  It is pervasive, involving people from multiple organizational units; but predominantly within the information technology organization.

Performance engineering objectives
Increase business revenue by ensuring the system can process transactions within the requisite timeframe
Eliminate system failure requiring scrapping and writing off the system development effort due to performance objective failure
Eliminate late system deployment due to performance issues
Eliminate avoidable system rework due to performance issues
Eliminate avoidable system tuning efforts
Avoid additional and unnecessary hardware acquisition costs
Reduce increased software maintenance costs due to performance problems in production
Reduce increased software maintenance costs due to software impacted by ad hoc performance fixes
Reduce additional operational overhead for handling system issues due to performance problems
Identify future bottlenecks by simulation over prototype
Increase server capability

Performance engineering approach
Because this discipline is applied within multiple methodologies, the following activities will occur within differently specified phases. However, if the phases of the rational unified process (RUP) are used as a framework, then the activities will occur as follows:

During the first, Conceptual phase of a program or project, critical business processes are identified. Typically they are classified as critical based upon revenue value, cost savings, or other assigned business value. This classification is done by the business unit, not the IT organization. High level risks that may impact system performance are identified and described at this time. An example might be known performance risks for a particular vendor system. Finally, performance activities, roles and deliverables are identified for the Elaboration phase. Activities and resource loading are incorporated into the Elaboration phase project plans.

Elaboration
During this defining phase, the critical business processes are decomposed to critical use cases. Probe cases will be decomposed further, as needed, to single page (screen) transitions. These are the use cases that will be subjected to script driven performance testing.

The type of requirements that relate to performance engineering are the non-functional requirements, or NFR. While a functional requirement relates to which business operations are to be performed, a performance related non-functional requirement will relate to how fast that business operation performs under defined circumstances.

Construction
Early in this phase a number of performance tool related activities are required. These include:
Identify key development team members as subject matter experts for the selected tools.
Specify a profiling tool for the development/component unit test environment.
Specify an automated unit (component) performance test tool for the development/component unit test environment; this is used when no GUI yet exists to drive the components under development.
Specify an automated tool for driving server-side unit (components) for the development/component unit test environment.
Specify an automated multi-user capable script-driven end-to-end tool for the development/component unit test environment; this is used to execute screen-driven use cases.
Identify a database test data load tool for the development/component unit test environment; this is required to ensure that the database optimizer chooses correct execution paths and to enable reinitializing and reloading the database as needed.
Deploy the performance tools for the development team.
Presentations and training must be given to development team members on the selected tools.

The performance test team normally does not execute performance tests in the development environment, but rather in a specialized pre-deployment environment that is configured to be as close as possible to the planned production environment. This team will execute performance testing against test cases, validating that the critical use cases conform to the specified non-functional requirements. The team will execute load testing against a normally expected (median) load as well as a peak load. They will often run stress tests that will identify the system bottlenecks. The data gathered, and the analysis, will be fed back to the group that does performance tuning. Where necessary, the system will be tuned to bring nonconforming tests into conformance with the non-functional requirements.

If performance engineering has been properly applied at each iteration and phase of the project to this point, hopefully this will be sufficient to enable the system to receive performance certification. However, if for some reason (perhaps proper performance engineering working practices were not applied) there are tests that cannot be tuned into compliance, then it will be necessary to return portions of the system to development for refactoring. In some cases the problem can be resolved with additional hardware, but adding more hardware leads quickly to diminishing returns.

Transition
During this final phase the system is deployed to the production environment. A number of preparatory steps are required. These include:
Configuring the operating systems, network, servers (application, web, database, load balancer, etc.), and any message queueing software according to the base checklists and the optimizations identified in the performance test environment
Ensuring all performance monitoring software is deployed and configured
Running statistics on the database after the production data load is completed

Once the new system is deployed, ongoing operations pick up performance activities, including:
Validating that weekly and monthly performance reports indicate that critical use cases perform within the specified non functional requirement criteria
Where use cases are falling outside of NFR criteria, submit defects
Identify projected trends from monthly and quarterly reports, and on a quarterly basis, execute capacity planning management activities

Service management
In the operational domain (post production deployment) performance engineering focuses primarily within three areas: service level management, capacity management, and problem management.

Service level management
In the service level management area, performance engineering is concerned with service level agreements and the associated systems monitoring that serves to validate service level compliance, detect problems, and identify trends. For example, when real user monitoring is deployed it is possible to ensure that user transactions are being executed in conformance with specified non-functional requirements. Transaction response time is logged in a database such that queries and reports can be run against the data. This permits trend analysis that can be useful for capacity management. When user transactions fall out of band, the events should generate alerts so that attention may be applied to the situation.

Capacity management
For capacity management, performance engineering focuses on ensuring that the systems will remain within performance compliance. This means executing trend analysis on historical monitoring generated data, such that the future time of non compliance is predictable. For example, if a system is showing a trend of slowing transaction processing (which might be due to growing data set sizes, or increasing numbers of concurrent users, or other factors) then at some point the system will no longer meet the criteria specified within the service level agreements. Capacity management is charged with ensuring that additional capacity is added in advance of that point (additional CPUs, more memory, new database indexing, et cetera) so that the trend lines are reset and the system will remain within the specified performance range.

Problem management
Within the problem management domain, the performance engineering practices are focused on resolving the root cause of performance related problems. These typically involve system tuning, changing operating system or device parameters, or even refactoring the application software to resolve poor performance due to poor design or bad coding practices.

Monitoring
To ensure that there is proper feedback validating that the system meets the NFR specified performance metrics, any major system needs a monitoring subsystem. The planning, design, installation, configuration, and control of the monitoring subsystem are specified by an appropriately defined monitoring process.
The benefits are as follows:
 It is possible to establish service level agreements at the use case level.
 It is possible to turn on and turn off monitoring at periodic points or to support problem resolution.
 It enables the generation of regular reports.
 It enables the ability to track trends over time, such as the impact of increasing user loads and growing data sets on use case level performance.

The trend analysis component of this cannot be undervalued. This functionality, properly implemented, will enable predicting when a given application undergoing gradually increasing user loads and growing data sets will exceed the specified non functional performance requirements for a given use case. This permits proper management budgeting, acquisition of, and deployment of the required resources to keep the system running within the parameters of the non functional performance requirements.

See also
Java performance
Scalability
Software quality
Software testing
Web performance

References

Further reading
Database Performance Tuning Guide
Practical Performance Analyst - Performance Engineering Community & Body Of Knowledge
Performance Engineering Methodology
A Performance Engineering Strategy
A Performance Process Maturity Model
The Every Computer Performance Book
Exploring UML for Performance Engineering
Introduction to Modeling Based Performance Engineering
Leveraging ITIL to Improve Application Performance
Patterns & Practices Performance Engineering
Performance and Scalability of Distributed Software Architectures
Performance Engineering Best Practices (High Level)
Software Engineering and Performance: A Road-map
The Vicious Cycle of Computer Systems Performance and IT Operational Costs
Microsoft Windows Server Performance Team 
Gathering Performance Requirements
Performance Testing Web Services: Strategies and Best Practices
Performance Evaluation of an Air Traffic Control System using the Application Response Measurement (ARM) Standard
Integration of Performance Management in ITIL

Software performance management
Software optimization